Aphantasia is the inability to create mental imagery.

The phenomenon was first described by Francis Galton in 1880 but has since remained relatively unstudied. Interest in the phenomenon renewed after the publication of a study in 2015 conducted by a team led by Professor Adam Zeman of the University of Exeter. Zeman's team coined the term aphantasia, derived from the ancient Greek word , which means "imagination", and the prefix , which means "without".

Research on the condition is still scarce. Hyperphantasia, the condition of having extremely vivid mental imagery, is the opposite of aphantasia.

History
The phenomenon was first described by Francis Galton in 1880 in a statistical study about mental imagery. Galton found it was a common phenomenon among his peers. He wrote:

In 1897, Théodule-Armand Ribot reported a kind of "typographic visual type" imagination, consisting in mentally seeing ideas in the form of corresponding printed words. As paraphrased by Jacques Hadamard,

The phenomenon remained largely unstudied until 2005, when Professor Adam Zeman of the University of Exeter was approached by a man who seemed to have lost the ability to visualize after undergoing minor surgery. Following the publication of this patient's case in 2010, a number of people approached Zeman reporting a lifelong inability to visualize. In 2015, Zeman's team published a paper on what they termed "congenital aphantasia", sparking renewed interest in the phenomenon.

Research
Zeman's 2015 paper used the Vividness of Visual Imagery Questionnaire (VVIQ), developed by David Marks in 1973, to evaluate the quality of the mental image of 21 self-diagnosed and self-selected participants. He identified that aphantasics lack voluntary visualizations only; they are still able to have involuntary visualizations such as dreams.

In 2017, a paper published by Rebecca Keogh and Joel Pearson, researchers at University of New South Wales, measured the sensory capacity of mental imagery using binocular-rivalry (BR) and imagery-based priming and found that when asked to imagine a stimulus, the self-reported aphantasics experienced almost no perceptual priming, compared to those who reported higher imagery scores where perceptual priming had an effect. In 2020, Keogh and Pearson published another paper illustrating measurable differences correlated with visual imagery, this time by indirectly measuring cortical excitability in the primary visual cortex (V1).

A 2020 study concluded that those who experience aphantasia also experience reduced imagery in other senses, and have less vivid autobiographical memories.

In 2021, a study that measured the perspiration (via skin conductance levels) of participants in response to reading a frightening story and then viewing fear-inducing images found that participants with aphantasia, but not the general population, experienced a flat-line physiological response during the reading experiment, but found no difference in physiological responses between the groups when participants viewed fear-inducing images. The study concluded the evidence supported the emotional amplification theory of visual imagery.

In 2021, a study found found that aphantasics have slower reaction times than non-aphantasics in a visual search task in which they were presented with a target and a distractor. But both groups saw a similar reduction in reaction time when primed with the color of the target compared to if primed with the color of the distractor or a third color, suggesting that aphantasics and non-aphantasics were primed in the same way. The researchers hypothesized that this may be because the color of the prime is not relevant to the search task. To explore this, a follow up experiment by the same researchers found non-aphantasiacs saw a greater reduction in reaction time when selecting the target from two image compared to from two words. At the same time, both aphantasiacs and non-aphantasics were faster in the image task than the word task. A 2023 study explored more natural scenarios and found that aphantasics are slower at solving hidden object pictures.

In 2021, a study relating aphantasia, synesthesia, and autism was published, pinpointing that aphantasics reported more autistic traits than controls, with weaknesses in imagination and social skills.

In addition to congenital aphantasia, there have been cases reported of acquired aphantasia, due either to brain injury or psychological causes.

A 2022 study estimated the prevalence of aphantasia among the general population by screening undergraduate students and people from an online crowdsourcing marketplace through the Vividness of Visual Imagery Questionnaire. They found that 0.8% of the population was unable to form visual mental images, and 3.9% of the population was either unable to form mental images or had dim or vague mental imagery. Sitek and Konieczna have shown that its progressive form may be a harbinger of dementia. A group of authors interviewed aphantasics about their lives and found that they generated fewer episodic details than controls for both past and future events, indicating that visual imagery is an important cognitive tool for dynamic retrieval and recombination of episodic details.

There have been various approaches to find a general theory of aphantasia or incorporate it into current philosophical, psychological and linguistic research. Blomkvist has suggested that aphantasia is best explained as a malfunction of processes in the episodic system and sees it as an episodic system condition. Aphantasia also has been studied from philosophical perspectives. Šekrst proposed that a gradual range of perceptions and mental images, from aphantasia to hyperphantasia, influences philosophical analysis of mental imagery from a fuzzy standpoint, along with influence on linguistics and semiotics. Whiteley argues that a modified theory of dreaming has to incorporate aphantasia, by involving the claim that dreams are a non-voluntary form of imagination.

Notable people with aphantasia

 Ed Catmull, co-founder of Pixar and former president of Walt Disney Animation Studios. Catmull surveyed 540 colleagues from Pixar about their mental visualization and found that the production managers tended to have stronger visualizations than the artists.
 Gordon Clark, 20th-century American Presbyterian theologian and philosopher. This likely influenced his development of an epistemology that did not rely on physical sensation but on rational propositional revelation from the Bible.
 Laura Kate Dale, English writer and activist.
James Harkin, British podcaster and television writer
Richard Herring, British comedian and podcaster
Penn Jillette, American magician and television personality
 Glen Keane, animator, author, and illustrator
 Lynne Kelly, writer on mnemonics and memory techniques. Kelly has reported that she has aphantasia, but notes that she still uses personal memory methods, such as the memory palace, which are typically thought to rely on visual memory.
 Mark Lawrence, fantasy author
 Yoon Ha Lee, science fiction author
 Laura Lexx, comedian
 Derek Parfit, British philosopher. His aphantasia may have influenced his longtime interest in photography.
 Blake Ross, co-creator of the web browser Mozilla Firefox. In April 2016, Ross published an essay describing his own aphantasia and his realization that not everyone experiences it. The essay gained wide circulation on social media and in a variety of news sources.
 Michelle Sagara, fantasy author
 Matthew Yglesias, journalist and co-founder of Vox

See also
 Charcot–Wilbrand syndrome

References

Further reading

  (foreword by Adam Zeman)

External links

 
 
 

Cognition
Imagination
Neurodiversity
Visual perception